In mathematics, a Burniat surface is one of the  surfaces of general type introduced by .

Invariants
The geometric genus and irregularity are both equal to 0. The Chern number  is either 2, 3, 4, 5, or 6.

References

Algebraic surfaces
Complex surfaces